Joffre Wilfred Desilets (April 16, 1915 – November 30, 1994) was a professional ice hockey player who played 192 games in the National Hockey League. He played with the Montreal Canadiens and Chicago Black Hawks. He was born in Capreol, Ontario but grew up in Renfrew, Ontario.

External links

1915 births
1994 deaths
Canadian ice hockey right wingers
Chicago Blackhawks players
Cleveland Barons (1937–1973) players
Dallas Texans (USHL) players
Fort Worth Rangers players
Franco-Ontarian people
Ice hockey people from Ontario
London Tecumsehs players
Montreal Canadiens players
New Haven Eagles players
People from Renfrew County
Providence Reds players